Mositi Torontle (born 1964) is a Botswanan oral poet and novelist.

Life
Mositi Torontle was born and grew up in Francistown. She has a degree from the University of Botswana and has worked as a teacher. Her 1993 novel The Victims examined labor immigration from neighbouring countries to South Africa.

Works
 The Victims, 1993

References

Botswana writers
Botswana women writers
1964 births
Living people
Botswana poets